The Bay Area Baracus Rugby Football Club is a men's rugby union team based in and around San Francisco, California. The club competes in the Northern California Rugby Football Union Division III and Division IV competitions.

History
The club was founded in 2001 in Oakland, California by alumni of Amherst College's rugby team. The name and motto (miseror stultum) of the club come from their adopted mascot, the popular The A-Team character, BA Baracus. The club began in the NCRFU Division III and after a strong showing gained promotion to the NCRFU Division II.  With an expanding roster of players, and fueled by the desire to provide playing opportunities for all club members, in 2018 the club decided to enter a team into NCRFU's Division III as well. In 2020, the team competes in Division III and Division IV boasting a healthy roster of over 70 players. 

Home games for the 2020 season are played in Boxer Stadium with official sponsors including Shiner Bock beer owned by the Spoetzl Brewery & The Wreck Room, located in California Street in downtown San Francisco.

The club has a strong program for both veterans and those newer to rugby; with rookies receiving reduced dues in their first year of playing at the club.

External links
Official Site
USA Rugby

Rugby union teams in San Francisco
Rugby clubs established in 2001
2001 establishments in California